"Vehicle" is a song recorded by American rock band The Ides of March for their debut studio album of the same name (1970). It was released as the lead single from the album in March 1970 through Warner Bros. Records. Written by vocalist and frontman Jim Peterik, the song is about a girl that often used him for her mode of transportation, leading Peterik to surmise that he was little more than her "vehicle". The arrangement includes a distinctive horn section riff, which caused some listeners to mistake the band for Blood, Sweat and Tears, who were also popular in that era.

"Vehicle" was a commercial success, and was purported to be the fastest-selling single in the history of Warner Bros. at that time. It peaked at number 2 on the Billboard Hot 100 in the US, while reaching the top 5 in Canada and just outside the top 30 in the United Kingdom. Despite this, the Ides of March never had another hit single, leaving them one-hit wonders. Peterik, however, was to go on to found the rock group Survivor, and become an extremely successful songwriter.

Background
Peterik wrote "Vehicle" as a tongue-in-cheek joke, having been initially inspired by anti-drug pamphlets passed out to high-schoolers. He expanded on the song's genesis in a piece for The Wall Street Journal:

Peterik had an on-again/off-again relationship with the woman after the song came out, and they eventually wed.

Fourteen seconds of the completed "Vehicle" master tape (primarily the guitar solo) was accidentally erased in the recording studio. The missing section was spliced in from a previously discarded take.

Chart performance
It rose to number 2 on the Billboard Hot 100 chart the week of May 23, 1970, behind "American Woman" by the Guess Who.  It was considered to be the fastest-selling single in Warner Bros. Records history at that time.

Chart history

Weekly charts

Year-end charts

Covers
 Richard Stoute of Barbados did a Spouge remix in 1974 on the Rainbow WIRL label.
 Bo Bice did a cover as a B-side of his 2005 single "Inside Your Heaven".
 Singer Tom Jones performed "Vehicle" in the 1970 season of his television series This is Tom Jones.
 Chet Baker's version is on the 1998 compilation album Talkin' Verve Groovy.
 Joe Lynn Turner covered the song in his 1997 rock album of covers, Under Cover.
 Shirley Bassey recorded this song in 1971, but it wasn't released until 1994; it is now a bonus track on her CD Something Else.
 Garage punk band Adam West recorded the song in 1994. It is available on their compilation album Five the Hard Way! [All Recordings 1992-1994].
 Star Trek actor Robert Picardo did a parody cover on one of his parody albums.
 Roadsaw covered this song for Sucking the 70s compilation.
 Puddles Pity Party performed "Vehicle" with the Ides of March on WGN June 6, 2019
 An instrumental cover of "Vehicle" was featured in a 1980s UK television commercial for Schweppes soft drinks, featuring British comedian Roy Jay.
Leonid and Friends on Chicagovich.
Gary Clark Jr. recorded his interpretation of "Vehicle" as part of the soundtrack in the 2022 animated film Minions: Rise of Gru.

Samples
Erykah Badu sampled the song for her 2000 track ". . . & on" on the Mama's Gun album.
The song is heavily sampled on Aloe Blacc's "King is Born".

See also
 List of 1970s one-hit wonders in the United States

References

External links
 Songfacts

1970 songs
1970 singles
Songs written by Jim Peterik
Warner Records singles